<< List of Vanity Fair caricatures (1890-1894) >> List of Vanity Fair caricatures (1900-1904)

Next List of Vanity Fair (British magazine) caricatures (1900-1904)

 
1890s in the United Kingdom